Soldano may refer to:

 Soldano, Liguria, a comune in the province of Imperia, Italy
 Soldano Custom Amplification, a custom guitar amplifier manufacturing company in the USA
 Cristian Mauro Soldano (born 1976), Argentine swimmer
 Diego Soldano (born 1969), Argentine actor
 Franco Soldano (born 1994), Argentine footballer
 Nina Soldano (born 1963), Italian actress

See also 
 Soldan (disambiguation)

Italian-language surnames